Peter Gwinn is an American comedy writer and improviser from Evanston, Illinois.  He attended Carleton College in Northfield, MN.  He was a member of The Second City Touring Company from 1997 to 2000. He has taught at both the I.O. and Upright Citizens Brigade theaters and is the founder of the musical improv group Baby Wants Candy.  He is the author of the 2003 book, Group Improvisation: The Manual of Ensemble Improv Games.  Gwinn was a staff writer for the TV political satire The Colbert Report until 2012-06-14.  He has made several on-screen appearances, as Jimmy the director, as a singer in a "Formula 401" sperm commercial and as a barbecue attendee. He has also written and appeared on the 2013 TV series Alpha House, produced by Amazon Studios.

Colbert announced in the final segment of his 2012-06-14 show that Gwinn was leaving the staff, giving no reason, but playing a clip package that ended with a stuffed effigy of Gwinn being thrown off the roof of the studio building, bouncing off a car into the street, and being run over by a minivan which backed up over the doll, twice, then drove away.

Gwinn now works for Wait Wait, Don’t Tell Me.

References

External links
 

Living people
American comedy writers
Carleton College alumni
Year of birth missing (living people)